Warren Range is an Antarctic mountain range about 15 nautical miles (28 km) long just west of Boomerang Range, with which it lies parallel, in Oates Land. Discovered by the Northern Survey Party of the Commonwealth Trans-Antarctic Expedition (1956–58), which called the highest summit "Mount Warren" after Guyon Warren, a member of the party in 1957–58. To avoid confusion with another mountain of the same name, the name Warren has instead been applied to the whole range.

Features
Geographical features include:

 Deception Glacier
 Mount Guyon
 Mount Ritchie
 Skelton Icefalls
 Wise Peak

Nearby features are:
 Hamner Nunatak
 Mount Darbyshire

Mountain ranges of Oates Land